St. Nicholas Church is a church in Perondi, Berat County, Albania. It became a Cultural Monument of Albania in 1963.

History and description
Built in the 11th century, the basilica has three naves, a wooden roof, and a vaulted altar. The narthex and belfry date to later, and in 1786 the roof was rebuilt and arches added. Specialists from the Institute of Monuments conducted renovations in 1930 and 1970, but the antiquity of the church is still evident.

References

Cultural Monuments of Albania
Buildings and structures in Kuçovë